The National Parliament House, Port Moresby or the National Parliament Building in Port Moresby, Papua New Guinea, is home to the National Parliament of Papua New Guinea.

Foundation
The Papua and New Guinea House of Assembly seated between 1964 and 1975 in a building in downtown Port Moresby that was previously used as a hospital. The National Parliament Building was officially opened by Prince Charles on 8 August 1984. The old building was demolished and it is currently being redeveloped as a Political History museum and library.

The National Parliament Building is adjacent to the Supreme Court Buildings.

References

External links 
 

 
Politics of Papua New Guinea 
Papua New Guinea
Westminster system
Papua New Guinea
Papua
1964 establishments in Papua New Guinea